Two events in tennis were contested at the 1904 Summer Olympics in St. Louis, United States.  The competitions were held from Monday, August 29, 1904 to Monday, September 5, 1904.

Medal summary

Events

Medal table

Participating nations
A total of 45 tennis players from 2 nations competed at the St. Louis Games:

References

External links
International Olympic Committee results database
  ITF, 2008 Olympic Tennis Event Media Guide

 
1904 Summer Olympics events
1904
Olympics
1904 Olympics
Tennis in Missouri